James Fitzgerald Gregg was Dean of Limerick from  1899 to 1905.

Biography
He was born into an ecclesiastical family in 1820 and educated at Trinity College, Dublin. He was ordained in 1844 and after curacies  at Yoxford, Kiltullagh and Collon held incumbencies in Balbriggan and Limerick before until his elevation to the Deanery.

He died on 31 October 1905.

Notes

1820 births
Alumni of Trinity College Dublin
Deans of Limerick
1905 deaths